Joan of Burgundy (c. 1293 – 12 December 1349), also known as Joan the Lame, was Queen of France as the first wife of King Philip VI. Joan ruled as regent while her husband fought on military campaigns during the Hundred Years' War during the years 1340, 1345–1346 and 1347.

Early life

Joan was the daughter of Duke Robert II of Burgundy and Agnes of France. Her older sister, Margaret, was the first wife of King Louis X of France. Joan married Philip of Valois, Louis's cousin, in July 1313. From 1314 to 1328, they were Count and Countess of Maine; from 1325, they were also Count and Countess of Valois and Anjou.

Queenship

The sons of King Philip IV - Louis X, Philip V, and Charles IV - left no surviving sons of their own, which led to the accession of Joan's husband to the French throne in 1328 as the eldest son of Charles of Valois, Philip IV's younger brother.

The Hundred Years' War ensued in 1337, with Edward III of England, a nephew of Louis X, claiming the French crown.

In a document issued by Philip VI at Clermont-en-Beauvaisis in August 1338, queen Joan was invested with power of attorney to manage the affairs of state whenever circumstances made it necessary.  She was explicitly allowed to manage the finances of the state, to make verdicts and issue pardons and all powers included in the king's duties except managing warfare.  This power of attorney was to be used whenever the king was absent, but it technically gave the queen the potential status of a co-ruler, and one reason suggested to Philip's great trust of Joan was his great distrust of his courtiers. Intelligent and strong-willed, Joan proved a capable regent while her husband fought on military campaigns during the war.

Joan reportedly favored people from her own home territory of Burgundy, a policy followed by her husband and her son, thus attracting animosity from the nobility at court from the northwest.

Her political activity attracted controversy to both her and her husband, which was accentuated by her deformity (considered by some to be a mark of evil), and she became known as la male royne boiteuse ("the lame evil Queen"). One chronicler described her as a danger to her enemies in court: 
"the lame Queen Jeanne de Bourgogne...was like a King and caused the destruction of those who opposed her will."

Joan was considered to be a scholar and a bibliophile. She sent her son, John, manuscripts to read, and commanded the translation of several important contemporary works into vernacular French, including the Miroir historial of Vincent de Beauvais (c.1333) and the Jeu d'échecs moralisés of Jacques de Cessoles (c.1347), a task carried out by Jean de Vignay.

Death
Joan died of the plague on 12 December 1349. She was buried in the Basilica of Saint Denis; her tomb, built by her grandson Charles V, was destroyed during the French Revolution.

Children 
Joan and Philip had nine children together:

 John II (26 April 1319 – 8 April 1364).
 Marie (1326 – 22 September 1333), who married John of Brabant, the son and heir of John III, Duke of Brabant, but died shortly afterwards.
 Louis (born and died 17 January 1329).
 Louis (8 June 1330 – 23 June 1330).
 A son [John?] (born and died 2 October 1333).
 A son (28 May 1335), stillborn.
 Philip (1 July 1336 – 1 September 1375), Duke of Orléans.
 Joan (born and died November 1337).
 A son (born and died summer 1343).

In 1361, Joan's grandnephew, Philip I of Burgundy, last duke of Burgundy of the first Capetian House of Burgundy, died without issue. The rightful heir to Burgundy was unclear. King Charles II of Navarre, grandson of Joan's elder sister Margaret, was the heir according to primogeniture, but John II of France (Joan's son) claimed to be the heir according to proximity of blood. In the end, John won.

In fiction
Joan is a character in Les Rois maudits (The Accursed Kings), a series of French historical novels by Maurice Druon. She was portrayed by Ghislaine Porret in the 1972 French miniseries adaptation of the series.

References

Sources

|-

1293 births
1349 deaths
Burials at the Basilica of Saint-Denis
Royalty and nobility with disabilities
14th-century women rulers
Regents of France
French queens consort
Countesses of Anjou
Countesses of Maine
House of Burgundy
14th-century deaths from plague (disease)
13th-century French women
13th-century French people
14th-century French women
14th-century French people